is a city located on Awaji Island in Hyōgo Prefecture, Japan. , the city had an estimated population of 42,597 and a population density of 230 persons per km².

Geography
The city of Awaji occupies the northern third of Awaji Island. It is connected to Kobe City to the north by the Akashi Kaikyo Bridge, and is sandwiched between Osaka Bay and the Gulf of Harima on the Seto Inland Sea. There are no large rivers in the city, but there are many agricultural ponds. The Tsuna hills run through the center of the city, with Mount Myoken (522 meters) as the highest point. The Nojima Fault (the focus of the Great Hanshin earthquake)is located in the city.

Surrounding municipalities 
Hyogo Prefecture
 Sumoto

Climate
Awaji has a Humid subtropical climate (Köppen Cfa) characterized by warm summers and cool winters with light to no snowfall.  The average annual temperature in Awaji is 16.3 °C. The average annual rainfall is 1600 mm with September as the wettest month. The temperatures are highest on average in August, at around 26.6 °C, and lowest in January, at around 6.6 °C.

Demographics
Per Japanese census data, the population of Awaji has been declining steadily over the past 70 years.

History
The city of Awaji is situated in ancient Awaji Province. It was ruled as part of Tokushima Domain during the Edo period. After the Meiji restoration, it became part of Tsuna District, Hyōgo. The town of Iwaya was established with the creation of the modern municipalities system April 1, 1889. On April 1, 1956 Iwaya merged with the neighboring town of Kariya and the villages of Url and Hamaguchi to form the town of  Awaji; however, on June 19, 1961 a portion of the town was separated to form the town of  Higashiura. On April 1, 2005 Awaji and Higashiura merged back together, along with the towns of Tsuna, Hokudan and Ichinomiya to form the city of Awaji.

Government
Awaji has a mayor-council form of government with a directly elected mayor and a unicameral city council of 18 members. Awaji contributes one member to the Hyogo Prefectural Assembly. In terms of national politics, the city is part of Hyōgo 9th district of the lower house of the Diet of Japan.

Economy
The local economy is largely rural, and is based on agriculture and commercial fishing. Awaji has traditionally been famous for its production of joss sticks, which in the early 1960s accounted for70% of the Japanese domestic market. The production of roof tiles is also a local speciality.

Education
Awaji has 11 public elementary schools and five public middle schools operated by the city government and two public high schools operated by the Hyōgo Prefectural Department of Education. There are also two private high schools. The Kansai University of Nursing and Health Sciences is located in Awaji.

The Ashiya University Awajishima Seaside Seminar Center, Kobe University Inland Sea Environment Education and Research Center and University of Hyogo Graduate School of Green Environment and Landscape Management are all located in Awaji.

The Awaji City Library serves Awaji. In 1999 this library and the West Bloomfield Library in West Bloomfield, Michigan in Metro Detroit were paired as sister institutions.

Transportation

Railway 
Awaji does not have any passenger rail service.

Highways 
  Kobe-Awaji-Naruto Expressway

Other
Jointly with Minami Awaji and Sumoto, the city operates a low-cost electric bike rental scheme, designed to attract visitors to stay for more than one day in order to explore the island.

Sister City relations 
  - Paranaguá, Paraná, Brazil, since May 29, 1986
  - St. Marys, Ohio, United States, since August 3, 2006

Local attractions

Awaji Yumebutai (Kiseki No Hoshi Greenhouse)
Izanagi Jingū,  ichinomiya of Awaji Province
Gossa Kaito Site, National Historic Site
Matsuho Battery Site, National Historic Site
Funaki Site, National Historic Site
Esaki Lighthouse
Akashi Kaikyo Bridge
Akashi Kaikyo National Government Park
Honpuku-ji Temple
Awaji World Park Onokoro.

Notable people from Awaji
 Toshio Iue, inventor and industrialist
 Takashi Sasano, actor
 Harukichi Yamaguchi, yakuza
 Tetsuya Watari, actor

References

External links 

 Awaji City official website 

Cities in Hyōgo Prefecture
Port settlements in Japan
Populated coastal places in Japan
Awaji, Hyōgo